"Roll Over Lay Down" is a song by the British Rock band Status Quo that was first released on the album Hello! in 1973.

It was later released as the A-side of a live EP, Quo Live in 1975. It was released to celebrate the band's 13th anniversary.

All of the tracks were recorded live and were taken from concerts at The Kursaal, Southend on 1 March 1975 and Trentham Gardens in Stoke the following night. The band released the EP against the advice of many people who predicted such a release would be a failure. It featured a picture sleeve that contained sleeve notes by BBC Radio 1 DJ John Peel. The centre of each copy of the record was specially moulded to feature the well known 'four heads' design (drawn by J Ifield) from the sleeve of the Quo album.

All three tracks were included as bonus tracks on the re-release of the On the Level album.

Track listing

Quo Live EP
 "Roll Over Lay Down" (Rossi/Young/Lancaster/Parfitt/Coghlan) – 5:40
 "Gerdundula" (Manston James) – 2:45
 "Junior's Wailing" (K White/M Pugh) – 3:50

Single
This single was released in France
 "Roll Over Lay Down" (live)
 "Where I Am"

Charts

Weekly charts

Year-end charts

References

Status Quo (band) songs
1975 singles
Songs written by Francis Rossi
Songs written by Bob Young (musician)
Songs written by Rick Parfitt